Stankovci is a municipality in Croatia in the Zadar County. According to the 2011 census, there are 2,003 inhabitants, of which the majority are Croats.

Settlements 

The settlements in the community are:
 Banjevci
 Bila Vlaka
 Budak
 Crljenik
 Morpolača
 Stankovci
 Velim

The community center is Stankovci, the largest settlement with 740 inhabitants.

References

Municipalities of Croatia
Populated places in Zadar County